Big Cheese is an English hardcore punk band from Leeds, West Yorkshire. In an article for Metal Hammer, Jimmy Wizard included their song "Rotter" in his "essential hardcore mixtape". They are a part of the New Wave of British Hardcore.

History
The band formed in 2016, when guitarist Maegan Brooks (who then-played in Rapture) and vocalist and then-bassist Tom "Razor" Hardwick (formerly of Obstruct, Fade, Violent Reaction and Shrapnel) began living together. After developing some of the songs Brooks had written, the pair decided to recruit Louis Hardy and Alex Wizard of fellow-Leeds hardcore band Higher Power to play guitar and drums, respectively. On 22 October 2017, they played a sold-out show the Camden Underworld with Trapped Under Ice, Higher Power, King Nine and Chamber. As soon as they began playing live, Hardwicke handed bass duties over to Anthony Wheatley (formerly of Sheffield hardcore band the Pact). In June 2018, they played Outbreak Festival in Leeds. In August they toured Europe with Illusion of New York. In October, they opened for Turnstile on their UK headline tour. On 17 April 2019, they released Don't Forget To Tell The World, a compilation of all their material released up to that point through Painkiller Records. This included their EP Aggravated Mopery and live tape from a NWOBHCFM Radio session. On 21 July, they opened for Have Heart on their reunion run at the Stylus in Leeds. In June and early-August, they began a European headline tour with Mere Mortal, followed by a European tour with Culture Abuse and Short Sharp Shock hosted by Vans. In October, they announced that they would be entering the studio to record their debut studio album Punishment Park. They released their first single from the album on 3 December 2019, titled "Write-Off". On 8 October 2021, they released the three track EP Anymore for Anymore.

Musical style
Big Cheese play hardcore punk and heavy hardcore. Their music is influenced by New York hardcore bands like Warzone, Killing Time, Leeway, Breakdown, Madball, Rest in Pieces, Sick of It All and Crumbsuckers in addition to UK bands like Motörhead, Charged GBH, Ripcord and Voorhees. They often make use of drums grooves and metallic riffs. Author Freddie Alva described their debut album as "a love letter to the NYHC sound during the late 1980s". In an article for Hard Noise, writer Fred Pessaro described their style as "Melding Breakdown metallic brutality and Warzone-y groove".

Members
Tom "Razor" Hardwick – lead vocals (2016–present), bass (2016–2017)
Louis Hardy – guitar (2016–present)
Maegan Brooks – guitar (2016–present)
Joe Williams – bass (2019–present)
Alex Wizard – drums (2016–present)

Former members
Anthony Wheatley - bass (2016–2019)

Discography
Studio albums
Punishment Park (2020)

EPs
Aggravated Mopery (2017)
Anymore for Anymore (2021)

Demos
Sports Day (2016)
Tower To The Sun (2018)

Compilations
Don't Forget To Tell The World (2019)

References

Musical groups established in 2016
Musical quintets
Hardcore punk groups from Leeds
Straight edge groups
Underground punk scene in the United Kingdom
2016 establishments in England